Tokatspor is a Turkish sports club in Tokat. The club was founded in 1969 and they play at the Gaziosmanpaşa Stadium, which has a capacity of 5,762. Their most notable accomplishment was a Turkish Cup stay group stage in 2008–09 season. Their greatest success were finishing 4th Second League Group C in 1980–81 season.

The team competed in the TFF Third League for the 2007–2008 season and promoted to TFF. 2 League. They will play in TFF Second League – Promotion Group in 2008–2009 season second session. Tokatspor was relegated to Super Amateur Leagues in 2020-2021.

Attendances 
 TFF First League: 1980–83
 TFF Second League: 1969–80, 1983–03, 2006–07, 2008–20
 TFF Third League: 2003–06, 2007–08, 2020–

References

External links 
 Official website
 Tokatspor on TFF.org

Sport in Tokat
Football clubs in Turkey
Association football clubs established in 1969
1969 establishments in Turkey